Republika means "Republic" or "The Republic" in several Balto-Slavic languages. It may refer to:

 Republika (band), a Polish rock band active 1978–1986 and 1990-2001
 Republika (Croatian magazine), a Croatian monthly for literature, arts and society established in 1945
 Republika (Indonesian newspaper), an Indonesian national daily newspaper published in 1993–2022, currently an online portal
 Republika (Macedonian newspaper), a Macedonian weekly newspaper established in 2012
 Republika (Serbian magazine), a Serbian magazine established in 1989

See also
Republic (disambiguation)
Republica (disambiguation)